Dottie West Sings is a studio album by American country music artist Dottie West. It was released in December 1965 on RCA Victor Records and was produced by Chet Atkins. The album was West's second studio album to be released as a recording artist. The record included several songs composed by West and other writers. It also included two singles that became top 40 hits on the Billboard country chart in 1965.

Background and content
Dottie West Sings was West's second album recorded in her career. The project was created following the success of West's major hit "Here Comes My Baby" and its subsequent Grammy Award in 1965. It was recorded in September 1965 at the RCA Victor Studio located in Nashville, Tennessee. It was West's second album produced by Chet Atkins. The album consisted of 12 track, similar to her first LP released in 1965. Three of the album's tracks were composed by Dottie West and her husband, Bill West. Bill West is also featured playing steel guitar on the album.

On the album, West also covered songs originally recorded by other artists. She covered Roger Miller's "When Two Worlds Collide" as well as Sonny James' "You're the Only World I Know". Two of the album's original tracks were composed by writers who would later become top country artists themselves. The sixth track, "It Just Takes Practice", was co-written by Jeannie Seely. In later years, Seely would befriend West and had major hits in the 1960s and 1970s. The opening track, "No Sign of Living", was written by Miriam Eddy. In later years, Eddy would change her name to Jessi Colter and have major hits in the 1970s.

Release and reception
Dottie West Sings was released in December 1965 on the RCA Victor label. It was West's second studio album for the record label. In 2015, it was released digitally. The album spent 19 weeks on the Billboard Top Country Albums chart before reaching the number 12 position in June 1966. The album included two singles that were first released in 1965. The first single was the album's opening track, "No Sign of Living". Released in March 1965, it became a top 40 hit on the Billboard Hot Country Singles chart by July, peaking at number 30. The second single issued was the track "No Sign of Living" in July 1965. The song also became a top 40 hit on the Billboard country chart, reaching number 32. Dottie West Sings was reviewed positively by Billboard magazine in January 1965. Staff writers praised album tracks such as "No Sign of Living" and also praised the album's arrangements. "This package adds luster to the already glittering name of Dottie. The tunes are generally poignant ones, of the weeper genre, and they are of a high order," writers commented.

Track listing

Original vinyl version

Digital download version

Personnel
All credits are adapted from the liner notes of Dottie West Sings.

Musical personnel
 Harold Bradley – guitar
 Kenneth Buttrey – drums
 Floyd Cramer – piano
 Ray Edenton – guitar
 The Anita Kerr Sings – background vocals
 Grady Martin – guitar
 Jerry Reed – guitar
 Henry Strzelecki – bass
 Bill West – steel guitar
 Dottie West – lead vocals

Technical personnel
 Chet Atkins – producer
 Anita Kerr – arrangement
 Bill McElhiney – arrangement 
 Jim Malloy – engineering
 Ray Stevens – arrangement

Chart performance

Release history

References

1965 albums
Albums produced by Chet Atkins
Dottie West albums
RCA Records albums